Gerald Nesbitt (born June 8, 1932) was a Canadian football player who played for the Ottawa Rough Riders. He won the Grey Cup with them in 1960. He played college football for the University of Arkansas Razorbacks.

References

1932 births
Sportspeople from Little Rock, Arkansas
Players of American football from Arkansas
Arkansas Razorbacks football players
Ottawa Rough Riders players
Living people